The Canadian High Arctic Ionospheric Network (CHAIN) is an array of ground-based radio instruments deployed in the Canadian Arctic and operated by the University of New Brunswick. The CHAIN instruments include high data-rate GPS receivers and digital ionosondes. After passing through the Earth's ionosphere, microwave GPS signals carry information about the total electron content (TEC). This information is commonly used to improve the precision of GPS and to study ionospheric morphology. Ionosondes transmit pulses of radio signals in the Medium Frequency (MF) and High Frequency (HF) ranges, whose echos are analyzed to measure height and density of the ionosphere. Advanced digital ionosondes used in the CHAIN network are also able to measure the bulk motion of ionospheric plasma.

Most of the CHAIN instruments are located within the polar cap defined as a region of open magnetic field lines. The polar cap ionosphere is directly linked to the interplanetary magnetic field carried by the solar wind. Polar cap thus provides a vantage point for the study of energy exchange between the solar wind, magnetosphere and ionosphere.

CHAIN is an integral part of the Canadian Geospace Monitoring (CGSM) programme. It provides ground support for Canadian and international scientific space missions such as THEMIS and CASSIOPE. CHAIN ionosonde and GPS data are used for tomographic reconstructions of polar cap plasma anomalies during geomagnetic storms 

In January 2012, the Canada Foundation for Innovation announced funding for the Expanded Canadian High-Arctic Ionospheric Network (ECHAIN). 
This funding was used to add 15 Global Positioning System (GPS) receivers to the existing network of GPS receivers and radars of the Canadian High Arctic Ionospheric Network (CHAIN). The data will contribute significantly to the progress of space research by providing a better understanding of the processes in the Sun-Earth system.

CHAIN instrument sites

References

External links
CHAIN Home Page

Scientific organizations based in Canada
Arctic research